Charles Leroy Dupre (born November 11, 1933) is a former American football player who played with the New York Titans. He played college football at Baylor University.

References

1933 births
Living people
American football defensive backs
Baylor Bears football players
New York Titans (AFL) players
Players of American football from Texas
People from Texas City, Texas